The Cowboy Millionaire is a 1935 American Western film directed by Edward F. Cline and written by George Waggner and Daniel Jarrett. The film stars George O'Brien, Evalyn Bostock, Edgar Kennedy, Maude Allen, Stephen Chase and Daniel Jarrett. The film was released on May 10, 1935, by Fox Film Corporation.

Plot
Bob Walker and his sidekick Persimmon work at a dude ranch type luxury hotel in order to gain money to work their gold mine. English ingénue Pamala Barclay comes to the hotel and eventually falls in love with Bob but returns to Great Britain after she discovers he made a bet that he would have a relationship with her. Meanwhile, a con man attempts to buy the yet unproductive gold mine for a cheap price from Persimmon with the two going to England. When the mine hits pay dirt, Bob travels to London to fight for his mine and his lady love.

Cast
George O'Brien as Bob Walker
Evalyn Bostock as Pamela Barclay
Edgar Kennedy as Willy Persimmon Bates
Maude Allen as Henrietta Barclay
Stephen Chase as Hadley Thornton 
Daniel Jarrett as Edward Doyle 
Lloyd Ingraham as Ben Barclay
Dean Benton as Desk Clerk
Thomas A. Curran as Mr. Nolan

References

External links 
 

1935 films
1930s English-language films
Fox Film films
American Western (genre) films
1935 Western (genre) films
Films directed by Edward F. Cline
American black-and-white films
1930s American films